The Charles W. Cross House is a historic two-story house in Ogden, Utah. It was built in 1890–1891, before Utah before a state, for Charles W. Cross, an immigrant from England who became a harness maker and council member in Ogden. The house was designed in the Queen Anne architectural style. It has been listed on the National Register of Historic Places since July 12, 1984.

References

		
National Register of Historic Places in Weber County, Utah
Queen Anne architecture in Utah
Houses completed in 1891
1891 establishments in Utah Territory